George Zuverink (August 20, 1924 – September 8, 2014) was a professional baseball player. He was a right-handed pitcher over parts of eight Major League Baseball seasons (1951–1952, 1954–1959) with the Cleveland Indians, Cincinnati Redlegs, Detroit Tigers and Baltimore Orioles. For his career, he compiled a 32–36 record in 265 appearances, mostly as a relief pitcher, with a 3.54 earned run average and 223 strikeouts.

Zuverink died in Tempe, Arizona from pneumonia as a result from a fractured hip he suffered from a fall in May 2014. He was 90 years old.

See also
 List of Major League Baseball annual saves leaders

References

.

External links

1924 births
2014 deaths
Major League Baseball pitchers
Cleveland Indians players
Cincinnati Redlegs players
Detroit Tigers players
Baltimore Orioles players
Fresno Cardinals players
Spartanburg Peaches players
Oklahoma City Indians players
Indianapolis Indians players
Miami Marlins (IL) players
Vancouver Mounties players
Baseball players from Michigan
Deaths from pneumonia in Arizona
United States Army Air Forces personnel of World War II